S. Iswaran (born 1962) is a Singaporean politician who has been serving as Minister for Transport since 2021 and Minister-in-charge of Trade Relations since 2018. A member of the governing People's Action Party (PAP), he has been the Member of Parliament (MP) representing the West Coast division of West Coast GRC since 2001. 

He had previously served as Minister in the Prime Minister's Office between 2011 and 2015, Minister for Trade and Industry (Industry) between 2015 and 2018, and Minister for Communications and Information between 2018 and 2021.

Prior to entering politics, Iswaran worked in various organisations in both the public and private sectors, including Temasek Holdings and the Ministry of Trade and Industry. 

He made his political debut in the 1997 general election as part of a four-member PAP team contesting in West Coast GRC and won 70.14% of the vote. He also held directorships in various organisations throughout his political career.

Education 
Iswaran attended Saint Andrew's School and National Junior College before graduating from the University of Adelaide with first class honours, where he read economics. He also holds a Master of Public Administration from Harvard University.

Career 
Before entering politics, Iswaran was Senior Vice President and Managing Director of Temasek Holdings (2003–2006), Director for International Trade at the Ministry of Trade and Industry, Chief Executive Officer of the Singapore Indian Development Association, and Director of Strategic Development at Singapore Technologies (1996–1998).

Throughout his political career, Iswaran concurrently held directorships in several organisations, including Quintiles Transnational, Sunningdale Tech, Shin Corporation, SciGen, PSA International, Sembcorp Industries, and Hyflux.

Political career 
Iswaran made his political debut in the 1997 general election when he contested as part of a four-member People's Action Party (PAP) team in West Coast GRC and won with 70.14% of the vote, becoming a Member of Parliament representing the Pasir Panjang ward. He switched to representing the West Coast ward of West Coast GRC from the 2001 general election onwards.

From 1 September 2004 to 19 April 2006, Iswaran was Deputy Speaker of Parliament. On 1 July 2006, he was appointed Minister of State at the Ministry of Trade and Industry.

After the 2006 general election, on 1 April 2008, Iswaran was promoted to Senior Minister of State at the Ministry of Trade and Industry. On 1 April 2009, he was given an additional appointment as Senior Minister of State at the Ministry of Education.

Following the 2011 general election, Iswaran was promoted to full Minister in the Cabinet and appointed Minister in the Prime Minister's Office, Second Minister for Home Affairs, and Second Minister for Trade and Industry. After the 2015 general election, on 1 October 2015, he relinquished his three positions and took up the portfolio of Minister for Trade and Industry (Industry) alongside Lim Hng Kiang, who was Minister for Trade and Industry (Trade). On 1 May 2018, he became Minister for Communications and Information, however he did continue in the Ministry of Trade and Industry (Singapore) as Minister In-Charge of Trade Relations.

After the 2020 general election, Iswaran continued as Minister in the Ministry of Communications and Information (Singapore). On 15 May 2021, after a Cabinet reshuffle, Iswaran became Minister for Transport while continuing his appointment as Minister-in-charge of Trade Relations.

Personal life 
Iswaran is married to Kay Mary Taylor. They have a daughter and two sons.

References

External links

 S. Iswaran  On Prime Minister's Office
 S. Iswaran on Parliament of Singapore

Members of the Cabinet of Singapore
Members of the Parliament of Singapore
People's Action Party politicians
Singaporean Tamil politicians
Harvard Kennedy School alumni
Singaporean people of Indian descent
National Junior College alumni
Saint Andrew's School, Singapore alumni
Singaporean Hindus
Singaporean people of Tamil descent
1962 births
Living people
Communications ministers of Singapore
Singaporean politicians of Indian descent
University of Adelaide alumni
Ministers for Trade and Industry of Singapore